"I Belong to You (Il Ritmo della Passione)" is a duet by Italian singer Eros Ramazzotti and American singer Anastacia, released as the second single from Ramazzotti's eleventh studio album, Calma apparente (2005), and the third from Anastacia's first greatest hits album, Pieces of a Dream (2005). It was met with commercial success in mainland Europe, particularly Germany, peaking at number one and becoming the ninth-biggest-selling song of 2006. It also topped the singles charts in Italy and Switzerland and peaked within the top five in several other countries.

The song is a ballad in which Anastacia sings in English and Ramazzotti in Italian or Spanish. As Ramazzotti records his songs in both Italian and Spanish, there are two versions of this song as well: the original one with Italian lyrics and the other with Spanish lyrics, entitled "I Belong to You (El ritmo de la pasión)", which is available on the Spanish versions of both Ramazzotti's and Anastacia's albums.

Critical reception
While reviewing Anastacia's Pieces of a Dream compilation, Lisa Haines of BBC Music referred to the song as "a gorgeous duet with Eros Ramazzotti which reveals a silkier side to the hard edge normally so distinctive in her voice, and ends with the kind of lung excess that would put Celine Dion to shame."

Music video
The music video was directed by Don Allan and was filmed in Rome, Italy, on 21–22 November 2005. In the video, Ramazzotti and Anastacia play a romantic couple.

Track listings
European CD single
 "I Belong to You (Il Ritmo della Passione)"
 "I Belong to You (El Ritmo de la Pasión)"

European maxi-CD single
 "I Belong to You (Il Ritmo della Passione)"
 "I Belong to You (El Ritmo de la Pasión)"
 "I Belong to You (Il Ritmo della Passione)" (video)
 "I Belong to You (El Ritmo de la Pasión)" (video)

Charts

Weekly charts

Year-end charts

Certifications

Release history

References

2000s ballads
2005 songs
2006 singles
Anastacia songs
Eros Ramazzotti songs
Macaronic songs
Male–female vocal duets
Number-one singles in Germany
Number-one singles in Italy
Number-one singles in Switzerland
Songs written by Anastacia
Songs written by Claudio Guidetti
Songs written by Eros Ramazzotti
Songs written by Kara DioGuardi